Dakoha is a small village in the Jalandhar Cantonment of the state of Punjab, northwest India. Most famous baba budha sahib ji gurudwara in dakoha and very beautiful park in located at grand truck road jalandhar cantt and more hospitals like jaswant singh hospital ,Nayyer hospital ,gitanjali hospital also.

See also

 Battle of Karbala

References 

Villages in Jalandhar district